1991 BA is a sub-kilometer asteroid, classified as near-Earth object of the Apollo group that was first observed by Spacewatch on 18 January 1991, and passed within 160,000 km (100,000 mi) of Earth. This is a little less than half the distance to the Moon. With a 5-hour observation arc the asteroid has a poorly constrained orbit and is considered lost. It could be a member of the Beta Taurids.

Description 
1991 BA is approximately 5 to 10 meters (15 to 30 ft) in diameter and is listed on the Sentry Risk Table. It follows a highly eccentric (0.68), low-inclination (2.0°) orbit of 3.3 years duration, ranging between 0.71 and 3.7 AU from the Sun. 1991 BA was, at the time of its discovery, the smallest and closest confirmed asteroid outside of Earth's atmosphere. 1991 BA is too faint to be observed except during close approaches to Earth and is considered lost.

Possible impact 
Virtual clones of the asteroid that fit the uncertainty region in the known trajectory show a 1 in 290,000 chance that the asteroid will impact Earth on 2023 January 18. It is estimated that an impact would produce an upper atmosphere air burst equivalent to 16 kt TNT, roughly equal to Nagasaki's Fat Man. The asteroid would appear as a bright fireball and fragment in the air burst into smaller pieces that would hit the ground at terminal velocity producing a meteorite strewn field. Impacts of objects this size are estimated to occur approximately once a year. Asteroid  was an object of similar size that was discovered less than a day before its impact on Earth on October 7, 2008 and produced a fireball and meteorite strewn field in the Sudan.

References

External links 
 IAUC 5172: 1991 BA; 4U 0115+63; 1990c – (Central Bureau for Astronomical Telegrams 1991 January 21)
 
 
 

Minor planet object articles (unnumbered)
19910118
Lost minor planets
Potential impact events caused by near-Earth objects
19910118